Lou Savarese (born July 14, 1965) is an American former professional boxer from Greenwood Lake, New York. On April 26, 1997, he challenged for the Lineal Heavyweight Championship, and lost by a controversial split decision to the Lineal World Heavyweight Champion George Foreman. A year later on June 25, 1998, Savarese won the IBA World Heavyweight title against former Undisputed World Heavyweight Champion Buster Douglas by way of a first-round knockout. On June 24, 2000, he lost by a first-round technical knockout to former Undisputed World Heavyweight Champion Mike Tyson. On September 22, 2002, Savarese won the vacant WBO Inter-Continental Heavyweight title, by way of a fifth-round TKO against former two-time World Heavyweight Champion Tim Witherspoon. On June 30, 2007, Savarese fought former four-time World Heavyweight Champion Evander Holyfield. He fought with great heart but lost by unanimous decision to a sharp looking Holyfield. Savarese announced after the fight that he had given it his all but it wasn't good enough, and this would be his last bout.

Amateur career
Savarese won two New York Golden Gloves Championships. Savarese won the 1985 Super-Heavyweight Novice Championship and the 1986 Super-Heavyweight Open Championship. In 1985 Savarese stopped (RSC-2) Jonathan Hill of Gleason's Gym in the finals to win the Championship and in 1986 Savarese defeated Alex Stewart of the Uptown Gym in the finals to win the Championship. In July 1986 he won gold at the U.S. Olympic Festival in Houston, Texas, defeating Kevin Ford on points (5–0) in the finals. In 1987 Savarese advanced to the finals of the Super Heavyweight Open division. He was to have met future Heavyweight Champion Riddick Bowe but Savarese was injured and could not box. In October 1987 he won the National PAL Championships in Jacksonville, Florida, defeating Farns Bryant.

Savarese trained at the Cage Recreation Center in White Plains, New York. Savarese is originally from Greenwood Lake, New York.  He now resides in Houston.

His ex-wife Louisa is the biological daughter of the famous musician and outdoorsman Ted Nugent.

Professional career

Savarese, a Roberts Elementarian, began his professional boxing career on April 30, 1989, knocking out James Smith (not the former world Heavyweight champion) in four rounds at Galveston, Texas. Savarese's first win by first round knockout came on his second fight, against Terrence Roberts, on May 25, at Atlantic City.

Savarese won his first eight fights by knockout. On April 19, 1990, Savarese was forced to fight an entire boxing fight for the first time, when he defeated Mike Robinson in Poughkeepsie, New York by a six-round decision. He proceeded to win his next seven fights by knockout, and, in 1991, Kayo boxing cards published a trading card featuring Savarese.

On September 20 of that year, he and Robinson had a rematch, with Savarese knocking Robinson out in the fourth round. His next fight, against Mike Faulkner on November 26, at White Plains, New York, resulted in a five-round disqualification win for Savarese.

On November 21, 1992, Savarese fought Larry Givens, who is mostly famous for his incredible lack of success as a professional boxer. Givens retired with a record of 3-46. Savarese managed to KO Givens in the 2nd round.

Savarese ran his record to 36–0, with 30 knockouts, but he was a relatively unknown fighter: apart from the 1991 Kayo boxing trading card, no other type of media attempted to make Savarese's name a household one, partly because of the type of opposition he had met. Of Savarese's thirty six opponents, none was known to most boxing fans. So the Savarese management team came with an ingenious, and not very often seen, way to draw the public's attention towards Savarese: a Lou Savarese fan club was created, and, by the middle 1990s, the fan club was being advertised on major boxing magazines, such as Ring and KO. The advertisement offered free membership to anyone, and promised free personalized, autographed photos to each new member.

The idea worked, and Savarese was next faced with his first relatively known opponent, Buster Mathis Jr. This fight was for the NABF's vacant regional Heavyweight title, and Savarese won the title on November 1, 1996, by knocking Mathis out in round seven, at Indio, California.

Next was a major fight against former two-time world Heavyweight champion George Foreman. The fight was held on April 26, 1997, in Atlantic City. It was Savarese's HBO Boxing television show's debut, and for the WBU "world Heavyweight title" and the Lineal Heavyweight Championship. While Savarese lost for the first time, he nevertheless impressed boxing critics and fans, many of whom felt he deserved the split decision that was given to Foreman. Savarese lost by scorecards of 110–118, 112-115 and a favorable 114–113.

Based on his performance against Foreman, the outcome of his next fight, against David Izon on November 1, was considered to be a mild upset. Savarese and Izon fought at New York's famed Apollo Theater, and Savarese suffered his first knockout defeat, when Izon beat him in five rounds.

But Savarese would rebound by scoring two important wins: on April 23, 1998, he defeated Jeff Lally by a knockout in round two at the Sheraton Hotel in Houston, and then, on June 25, he scored what was arguably his biggest career win, beating Buster Douglas, a former world Heavyweight champion and the first man to beat Mike Tyson, by knockout in the first round to win IBA's "World" Heavyweight title.

After that, he fought only twice in 1999, winning a split decision over then prospect Lance "Mount" Whitaker and losing by ten-round decision against future Lennox Lewis world championship challenger Michael Grant, on June 19 at New York's Madison Square Garden.

More than one year later, on June 24, 2000, Savarese had his first fight abroad, when he faced Tyson in Glasgow, Scotland. The fight was stopped thirty eight seconds into the first round. While attempting to stop Tyson, referee John Coyle was accidentally pulled to the floor by him. Tyson was declared the winner by technical knockout.

Savarese remained active, and, after two wins, he beat David Bostice on November 2, 2001, by a twelve-round decision.

Another major win for Savarese came on September 22, 2002, when he beat former two-time world Heavyweight champion Tim Witherspoon by a knockout in round five at Friant, California.

On March 15, 2003, he lost the title to former John Ruiz world title challenger Kirk Johnson, who knocked Savarese out in four rounds at Dallas.

Attempting to win another regional Heavyweight title, Savarese fought Leo Nolan, for the IBA's vacant Americas Heavyweight title, but he lost to Nolan by a twelve-round unanimous decision on May 7, 2004. Lou Savarese returned to the ring on March 18, 2006, stopping Marcus Rhode in two rounds at Convention Center in Fort Smith, Arkansas. His record then stood at 44-6, with 36 wins by knockouts.

Savarese is trained by Jesse Reid, who survived a shooting in 1984 when another of his boxers, former WBC world Jr. Welterweight champion Bruce Curry shot him two days after losing to Billy Costello.

Lou Savarese continued his comeback by stopping Travis Fulton in 3 rounds on January 18, 2007, in Houston TX. Savarese showed he still had decent ability and brought his record to 45-6, 37 wins by knockout.

On June 30, 2007, Savarese fought former Heavyweight Champion Evander Holyfield. He fought with great heart but lost by decision to a sharp looking Holyfield. Savarese announced after the fight that he had given it his all but it wasn't good enough, and this would be his last bout.

Mixed martial arts career
On June 20, 2013, Savarase competed in a mixed martial arts bout. He won the fight by first-round TKO.

Acting career
Savarese has been featured in episodes of The Jury, Guiding Light, The Sopranos, Damages, and Rescue Me as well as the movie We Own the Night. He also played a lead role in ESPN’s documentary Cinderella Man: The James J. Braddock Story, for which he received excellent reviews for his portrayal of boxer Max Baer. Other recent works include the independent film Nicky’s Game, A Matter of Honor, and Knock, Knock, a horror film in which he plays Rico, the villain.

Professional boxing record

|-
| align="center" style="border-style: none none solid solid; background: #e3e3e3"|Result
| align="center" style="border-style: none none solid solid; background: #e3e3e3"|Record
| align="center" style="border-style: none none solid solid; background: #e3e3e3"|Opponent
| align="center" style="border-style: none none solid solid; background: #e3e3e3"|Type
| align="center" style="border-style: none none solid solid; background: #e3e3e3"|Rounds
| align="center" style="border-style: none none solid solid; background: #e3e3e3"|Date
| align="center" style="border-style: none none solid solid; background: #e3e3e3"|Location
| align="center" style="border-style: none none solid solid; background: #e3e3e3"|Notes
|-align=center
|Loss
|46–7
|align=left| Evander Holyfield
|UD
|10
|30/06/2007
|align=left| Don Haskins Convention Center, El Paso, Texas, U.S.
|align=left|
|-align=center
|Win
|46–6
|align=left| Matt Hicks
|KO
|1 
|05/04/2007
|align=left| Grand Plaza Hotel, Houston, Texas, U.S.
|align=left|
|-align=center
|Win
|45–6
|align=left| Travis Fulton
|TKO
|3 
|08/01/2007
|align=left| Grand Plaza Hotel, Houston, Texas, U.S.
|align=left|
|-align=center
|Win
|44–6
|align=left| Marcus Rhode
|TKO
|2 
|18/03/2006
|align=left| Convention Center, Fort Smith, Arkansas, U.S.
|align=left|
|-align=center
|Loss
|43–6
|align=left| Leo Nolan
|UD
|12
|07/05/2004
|align=left| Foxwoods Resort, Mashantucket, Connecticut, U.S.
|align=left|
|-align=center
|Loss
|43–5
|align=left| Kirk Johnson
|TKO
|4 
|15/03/2003
|align=left| Club Life, Dallas, Texas, U.S.
|align=left|
|-align=center
|Win
|43–4
|align=left| Tim Witherspoon
|TKO
|5 
|22/09/2002
|align=left| Table Mountain Casino, Friant, California, U.S.
|align=left|
|-align=center
|Win
|42–4
|align=left| David Bostice
|UD
|12
|02/11/2001
|align=left| Foxwoods Resort, Mashantucket, Connecticut, U.S.
|align=left|
|-align=center
|Win
|41–4
|align=left| Tom Glesby
|TKO
|3 
|12/06/2001
|align=left| Astro Pavilion, Houston, Texas, U.S.
|align=left|
|-align=center
|Win
|40–4
|align=left| Marcus Rhode
|TKO
|2 
|02/05/2001
|align=left| Astro Pavilion, Houston, Texas, U.S.
|align=left|
|-align=center
|Loss
|39–4
|align=left| Mike Tyson
|TKO
|1 
|24/06/2000
|align=left| Hampden Park, Glasgow, Scotland
|align=left|
|-align=center
|Loss
|39–3
|align=left| Michael Grant
|UD
|10
|19/06/1999
|align=left| Madison Square Garden, New York, New York, U.S.
|align=left|
|-align=center
|Win
|39–2
|align=left| Lance Whitaker
|SD
|10
|06/03/1999
|align=left| Convention Center, Atlantic City, New Jersey, U.S.
|align=left|
|-align=center
|Win
|38–2
|align=left| Buster Douglas
|KO
|1 
|25/06/1998
|align=left| Foxwoods Resort, Mashantucket, Connecticut, U.S.
|align=left|
|-align=center
|Win
|37–2
|align=left| Jeff Lally
|TKO
|2 
|23/04/1998
|align=left| Sheraton Hotel, Houston, Texas, U.S.
|align=left|
|-align=center
|Loss
|36–2
|align=left| David Izon
|KO
|5 
|01/11/1997
|align=left| Apollo Theater, New York, New York, U.S.
|align=left|
|-align=center
|Loss
|36–1
|align=left| George Foreman
|SD
|12
|26/04/1997
|align=left| Convention Center, Atlantic City, New Jersey, U.S.
|align=left|
|-align=center
|Win
|36–0
|align=left| Buster Mathis Jr.
|TKO
|7 
|01/11/1996
|align=left| Fantasy Springs Casino, Indio, California, U.S.
|align=left|
|-align=center
|Win
|35–0
|align=left| Tim Puller
|TKO
|2 
|20/08/1996
|align=left| MSG Theater, New York, New York, U.S.
|align=left|
|-align=center
|Win
|34–0
|align=left| Lyle McDowell
|TKO
|2 
|12/01/1996
|align=left| Madison Square Garden, New York, New York, U.S.
|align=left|
|-align=center
|Win
|33–0
|align=left| Sean Hart
|TKO
|2 
|12/12/1995
|align=left| Atlantic City, New Jersey, U.S.
|align=left|
|-align=center
|Win
|32–0
|align=left| Olian Alexander
|TKO
|6 
|06/10/1995
|align=left| Atlantic City, New Jersey, U.S.
|align=left|
|-align=center
|Win
|31–0
|align=left| Edgar Turpin
|KO
|1 
|18/08/1995
|align=left| Middletown, New York, U.S.
|align=left|
|-align=center
|Win
|30–0
|align=left| Brian Morgan
|PTS
|8
|05/03/1995
|align=left| Civic Assembly Center, Muskogee, Oklahoma, U.S.
|align=left|
|-align=center
|Win
|29–0
|align=left| Ken Merritt
|TKO
|4 
|05/11/1994
|align=left| Caesars Tahoe, Stateline, Nevada, U.S.
|align=left|
|-align=center
|Win
|28–0
|align=left| Henry Wilson
|KO
|1 
|13/09/1994
|align=left| Marriott Hotel, Kansas City, Missouri, U.S.
|align=left|
|-align=center
|Win
|27–0
|align=left| Bill Duncan
|KO
|1 
|01/03/1994
|align=left| Jefferson City, Missouri, U.S.
|align=left|
|-align=center
|Win
|26–0
|align=left| Nathaniel Fitch
|UD
|10
|17/04/1993
|align=left| Fernwood Resort, Bushkill, Pennsylvania, U.S.
|align=left|
|-align=center
|Win
|25–0
|align=left| Fred Whitaker
|KO
|6 
|23/12/1992
|align=left| Westchester County Center, White Plains, New York, U.S.
|align=left|
|-align=center
|Win
|24–0
|align=left| Larry Givens
|KO
|2 
|21/11/1992
|align=left| Beban Park, Nanaimo, British Columbia, Canada
|align=left|
|-align=center
|Win
|23–0
|align=left| Elvin Evans
|KO
|2 
|27/03/1992
|align=left| Catskill, New York, U.S.
|align=left|
|-align=center
|Win
|22–0
|align=left| Mike Faulkner
|DQ
|5 
|26/11/1991
|align=left| Westchester County Center, White Plains, New York, U.S.
|align=left|
|-align=center
|Win
|21–0
|align=left| Mike Robinson
|TKO
|4 
|20/09/1991
|align=left| Westchester County Center, White Plains, New York, U.S.
|align=left|
|-align=center
|Win
|20–0
|align=left| Mark Young
|UD
|8
|23/07/1991
|align=left| Kushers Country Club, Monticello, New York, U.S.
|align=left|
|-align=center
|Win
|19–0
|align=left| Larry Smith
|KO
|6 
|02/07/1991
|align=left| Ragley, Louisiana, U.S.
|align=left|
|-align=center
|Win
|18–0
|align=left| Max Key
|KO
|1 
|26/02/1991
|align=left| Birmingham, Alabama, U.S.
|align=left|
|-align=center
|Win
|17–0
|align=left| Marshall Tillman
|UD
|6
|11/01/1991
|align=left| Trump Taj Mahal, Atlantic City, New Jersey, U.S.
|align=left|
|-align=center
|Win
|16–0
|align=left| Marcus Dorsey
|KO
|2 
|04/12/1990
|align=left| Vinton, Louisiana, U.S.
|align=left|
|-align=center
|Win
|15–0
|align=left| James Ruffin
|KO
|1 
|25/10/1990
|align=left| Texas Longhorn Club, Vinton, Louisiana, U.S.
|align=left|
|-align=center
|Win
|14–0
|align=left|Travis Pickering
|KO
|1 
|06/10/1990
|align=left| Great Falls, Montana, U.S.
|align=left|
|-align=center
|Win
|13–0
|align=left| Barry Kirton
|KO
|2 
|14/08/1990
|align=left| City Center, Saratoga Springs, New York, U.S.
|align=left|
|-align=center
|Win
|12–0
|align=left| James Ruffin
|KO
|2 
|17/07/1990
|align=left| Lake Charles, Louisiana, U.S.
|align=left|
|-align=center
|Win
|11–0
|align=left| Dan Ross
|KO
|1 
|04/07/1990
|align=left| Phillips County Fairgrounds, Billings, Montana, U.S.
|align=left|
|-align=center
|Win
|10–0
|align=left| Andre Crowder
|KO
|1 
|18/05/1990
|align=left| Callicoon, New York, U.S.
|align=left|
|-align=center
|Win
|9–0
|align=left| Mike Robinson
|PTS
|6
|19/04/1990
|align=left| Poughkeepsie, New York, U.S.
|align=left|
|-align=center
|Win
|8–0
|align=left| Ken Elliott
|KO
|2 
|15/03/1990
|align=left| Fairmont Hotel, Dallas, Texas, U.S.
|align=left|
|-align=center
|Win
|7–0
|align=left| Melvin Young
|KO
|2 
|11/12/1989
|align=left| Convention Center, Pasadena, Texas, U.S.
|align=left|
|-align=center
|Win
|6–0
|align=left| Randy Rivers
|TKO
|2 
|24/11/1989
|align=left| Broome County Arena, Binghamton, New York, U.S.
|align=left|
|-align=center
|Win
|5–0
|align=left| John Basil Jackson
|TKO
|1 
|10/11/1989
|align=left| Villa Roma Resort, Callicoon, New York, U.S.
|align=left|
|-align=center
|Win
|4–0
|align=left| Alan Jamison
|KO
|1 
|26/10/1989
|align=left| Kemper Arena, Kansas City, Missouri, U.S.
|align=left|
|-align=center
|Win
|3–0
|align=left| Robert Horton
|KO
|1 
|05/10/1989
|align=left| Houston, Texas, U.S.
|align=left|
|-align=center
|Win
|2–0
|align=left| Terrence Roberts
|TKO
|1 
|25/05/1989
|align=left| Resorts International, Atlantic City, New Jersey, U.S.
|align=left|
|-align=center
|Win
|1–0
|align=left| James Smith
|KO
|4 
|30/04/1989
|align=left| Moody Center, Galveston, Texas, U.S.
|align=left|
|-align=center

Mixed martial arts record

|Win
|align=center|1–0
|Tim Papp
|TKO 
|Savarese Promotions
|
|align=center|1
|align=center|1:47
|Bayou City Event Center, Houston, Texas, United States
|
|-

References

External links
 
 
 http://www.sherdog.com/fighter/Louis-Savarese-138251
 

|-

|-

1965 births
Living people
American people of Italian descent
American male actors
Sportspeople from Houston
American male boxers
Heavyweight boxers